The Spanish Patent and Trademark Office (Spanish: Oficina Española de Patentes y Marcas, sometimes abbreviated SPTO or OEPM) is an autonomous agency of the Ministry of Industry, Trade and Tourism of Spain. The Spanish Patent and Trademark Office, created in the 19th century, is in charge of patents in Spain. It also acts as International Searching Authority (ISA) and International Preliminary Examining Authority (IPEA) under the procedures established by the Patent Cooperation Treaty (PCT). Since June 2018, its Director General is José Antonio Gil Celedonio.

References

External links 
  Spanish Patent and Trademark Office
  History of the Spanish Patent and Trademark Office

Spanish intellectual property law
Government of Spain
Patent offices
International Searching and Preliminary Examining Authorities